Cytharopsis radulina is a species of sea snail, a marine gastropod mollusk in the family Mangeliidae.

Description
The length of the shell attains 9.2 mm.

Distribution
This marine species occurs in the East China Sea; off Japan and Fiji

References

 Kuroda, T.; Habe, T.; Oyama, K. (1971). The Sea Shells of Sagami Bay. Maruzen Co., Tokyo. xix, 1–741 (Japanese text), 1–489 (English text), 1–51 (Index), pls 1–121.

External links
  Tucker, J.K. 2004 Catalog of recent and fossil turrids (Mollusca: Gastropoda). Zootaxa 682:1–1295.
 

radulina
Gastropods described in 1971